M&G Recovery Fund is a British open-ended investment company launched on 23 May 1969, and is the third-largest open-ended fund in the UK (behind Neil Woodford's two equity income funds) with £7.4 billion of assets as of 31 May 2012.

It was managed by Tom Dobell between 2000 and 2020, with deputies Michael Stiasny and David Williams since January 2011. Michael Stiasny was appointed manager in 2021.The fund makes a charge of 1.5% per annum.

Its investment focus is investing 'in a diversified range of securities issued by companies which are out of favour, in difficulty or whose future prospects are not fully recognised by the market. The sole aim of the Fund is capital growth.'

References

Investment companies of the United Kingdom
Financial services companies of the United Kingdom
Financial services companies established in 1969
1969 establishments in England